Edward Roe Yeo (3 July 1742 – 23 December 1782) was a British Member of Parliament.

He was the only son of George Yeo of Huish, Devon by his wife Ann Beresford. Educated at Eton College 1758–60, and at Exeter College, Oxford 1761, he trained as a lawyer in the Middle Temple, 1751.

He was twice Member of Parliament for Coventry, 1774–1780 and from 27 February 1781 to 23 December 1782 (his death), though there is no record of him having spoken in Parliament.

He died unmarried on 23 December 1782, and was the last in the line of Yeo of Huish.

Notes

References

1742 births
1782 deaths
People from Torridge District
People educated at Eton College
Alumni of Exeter College, Oxford
Members of the Middle Temple
Members of the Parliament of Great Britain for English constituencies
British MPs 1774–1780
British MPs 1780–1784
Members of Parliament for Coventry